Trupanea syrmophora is a species of tephritid or fruit flies in the genus Tephritomyia of the family Tephritidae.

Distribution
Fruit flies feed upon fruit, leaf's, honeydew, and vegetables Chile.

References

Tephritinae
Insects described in 1942
Diptera of South America
Endemic fauna of Chile